Faridun Nahar Laily is an Awami League politician and the former Member of Bangladesh Parliament from a women's reserved seat.

Career
Laily was elected to Parliament from reserved seat in Noakhali as a Bangladesh Awami League candidate in 2009.

Laily is the Agriculture and Cooperative Secretary of Bangladesh Awami League.

References

Awami League politicians
Living people
Women members of the Jatiya Sangsad
9th Jatiya Sangsad members
21st-century Bangladeshi women politicians
21st-century Bangladeshi politicians
Year of birth missing (living people)